Mall of Amritsar (previously known as Alpha One Mall) is a shopping mall  situated on GT Road, Amritsar, Punjab, India developed by Alpha G Group and is the third largest mall in the Indian State of Punjab.

Construction 
The Mall was designed by ARCOP and opened to public in 2009. The mall was strategically located closely to the New Amritsar economic zone. The complex of mall also hosts the 5 star luxury hotel Hyatt Regency Amritsar which stands adjacent to the building of the mall. The hotel, with over 248 rooms is one of the largest hotels in the city.

Acquisition 
Alpha G Group, the original developer of the mall later sold the mall to Blackstone in December 2015 along with its Alpha One Mall, Ahmedabad which rebranded the mall to "Mall of Amritsar" for a deal costing Rs. 800 Crore.

Entertainment 
The Mall offers a complete package of entertainment and shopping experience for its visitors. As of now, the Mall  is undergoing a surreal metamorphosis that not only includes churning of brands but also changing circulation for the patrons in the mall. The food court is being relocated and will be home to several brands that will not only be First in city but also first in Punjab.

References

Shopping malls in Punjab, India
2009 establishments in Punjab, India
Shopping malls established in 2009
Amritsar